Alamid is a Filipino rock band from Manila.

History
The two main members Gary Ignacio and Dexter Facelo met while attending the St. James Academy in Malabon. In 1993, they signed to Warner Bros. Records (Warner Music Philippines) and released three albums.

On November 4, 1994 the band along with Razorback opened for the American Rock Band supergroup Mr. Big at their concert at the Folk Arts Theater.

Their hit single "Your Love" was named Song of the Year at the NU107 Rock Awards in 1994. In 2006, it was covered by Erik Santos generating renewed interest in the band, although Ignacio and Facelo constituted the band at that time. They were managed by Dodong Viray until his demise. They had further success with the songs "Just Wasn't Brave Enough" and "Still Believe in Love" while the intro to "China Eyes" was used for ABS-CBN sitcom Palibhasa Lalake.

In 1995, the song "Batibot" was used as a theme song for the children's show of the same name. They collaborated with the rapper Francis Magalona on the song "1896".

The band continue to play live both in the Philippines and abroad.

On April 17, 2015, former frontman Gary Ignacio died due to multiple organ failure.

Current members
Dexter Facelo - Guitars, vocals
 Gene Mitra- Keyboards, vocal
 Thalie Facelo- Bass, vocals
 Jex Herradura - Drums, vocals

Former members
Gary Ignacio (Deceased)
 Efryl De Dios
 Jay Dominic Sto. Tomas
 Perry Jocson
 Jet Broas
 Gail Ignacio
 Mark Stephen Felipe

Discography

Albums
 Alamid (Warner Philippines, 1994)
 Panaginip (Warner, 1995)
 Radio Friendly (Warner, 1997)
 Anting-anting (independently released, 2005)

Compilation albums
 The Best of Alamid (Warner, 2001)
 Rock Grooves in Delirious Ways (2007)
 1896 (Ang Pagsilang) (1996)
 Servant Of All 2: In His Time (Viva Records, 2002)
 Superbands (2006)

Awards

References

External links
 Official website of Alamid
 Official Multiply Page of Alamid

Filipino rock music groups
Musical groups from Metro Manila